GP-100 can refer to

 A model of Suzuki motorcycle

The Japanese vintage motorcycle Suzuki GP 100 U  is not described fully. A separate page should be created for this particular motor cycle which became popular due to 1980's Grand Prix (GP) motor cycle races.

 Ruger GP100, an American revolver
 glycoprotein 100, a melanoma antigen
 Gp100:209-217(210M), a peptide cancer vaccine.